Zavareh-ye Saland Kuh (also Romanized as Zavarah-ye Sāland Kūh) is a village in Sardasht Rural District, Sardasht District, Dezful County, Khuzestan Province, Iran. At the 2006 census, its population was 82, in 15 families.

References 

Populated places in Dezful County